Description language may refer to:

 Interface description language aka interface definition language (IDL)
 Regular Language description for XML (RELAX)
 Web Services Description Language (WSDL) 
 Page description language (PDL)
 Binary Format Description language - extension of XSIL
 Hardware description language - for circuits
 VHSIC hardware description language - for Field-programmable gate arrays, and logic circuits
 Job Submission Description Language
 Architecture description language
 Specification and Description Language - a specification language
 Character Description Language - for CJK fonts
 Scene description language

See also
 DDL (disambiguation)
 Specification and Design Language